The men's hammer throw event at the 1988 World Junior Championships in Athletics was held in Sudbury, Ontario, Canada, at Laurentian University Stadium on 29 and 30 July.  A 7257g (senior implement) hammer was used.

Medalists

Results

Final
30 July

Qualifications
29 Jul

Group A

Participation
According to an unofficial count, 16 athletes from 13 countries participated in the event.

References

Hammer throw
Hammer throw at the World Athletics U20 Championships